The National Historic Landmarks in Alabama represent Alabama's history from the precolonial era, through the Civil War, the Civil Rights Movement, and the Space Age.  There are 39 National Historic Landmarks (NHLs) in Alabama, which are located in 18 of the state's 67 counties.  Five of the NHLs in the state have military significance, eight are significant examples of a particular architectural style, six are archaeological sites, seven played a role in the African American struggle for civil rights, and five are associated with the development of the U.S. Space Program. One site in Alabama was designated a NHL, but the designation was subsequently removed.

The National Historic Landmark program is administered by the National Park Service, a branch of the Department of the Interior.  The National Park Service determines which properties meet NHL criteria and makes nomination recommendations after an owner notification process.  The  Secretary of the Interior reviews nominations and, based on a set of predetermined criteria, makes a decision on NHL designation or a determination of eligibility for designation. Both public and privately owned properties are designated as NHLs.  This designation provides indirect, partial protection of the historic integrity of the properties, via tax incentives, grants, monitoring of threats, and other means.  Owners may object to the nomination of the property as a NHL. When this is the case the Secretary of the Interior can only designate a site as eligible for designation.

NHLs are also included on the National Register of Historic Places (NRHP), historic properties that the National Park Service deems to be worthy of preservation. The primary difference between a NHL and a NRHP listing is that the NHLs are determined to have national significance, while other NRHP properties are deemed significant at the local or state level.  The NHLs in Alabama comprise 3% of the approximately 1178 properties and districts listed on the National Register of Historic Places in Alabama.

Four historic sites in the state are managed by the National Park Service. One of these, the Tuskegee Institute National Historic Site, is also designated a NHL. The others are Horseshoe Bend National Military Park, Russell Cave National Monument, and Tuskegee Airmen National Historic Site.

Key

National Historic Landmarks

|}

Former National Historic Landmark

See also
National Register of Historic Places listings in Alabama
History of Alabama
List of U.S. National Historic Landmarks by state
List of areas in the United States National Park System
List of National Natural Landmarks in Alabama

References

External links
 National Historic Landmarks Program, at National Park Service

Alabama
 
Alabama-related lists
Lists of buildings and structures in Alabama